Karya is a village, a community and a municipal unit of the Elassona municipality. Before the 2011 local government reform it was an independent community. The 2011 census recorded 542 inhabitants in the community and 719 in the municipal unit. The community of Karya covers an area of 74.964 km2 while the municipal unit covers 158.685 km2.

Administrative division
The municipal unit of Karya consists of three communities:
Karya
 Kryovrysi
 Sykaminea

Population
According to the 2011 census, the population of the settlement of Karya was 542 people, a decrease of almost 18% compared with the population of the previous census of 2001.

Geography and climate
It is close to Mount Olympus, encouraging tourists' visits. The area has moderate temperatures year round, though in winter snow falls over the upper elevations.

Morias Cave
In the midst of World War II in 1941, a Nazi brigade stormed the village of Karya. A local hero, Aléxandros Yiannis Morias discovered a cave in Mount Olympus to hide the town from the Nazi invaders. The villagers were unharmed thanks to the discovery of the cave. In honor of the heroics of Aléxandros, the cave has since been named Morias Cave.

See also
 List of settlements in the Larissa regional unit

References

Populated places in Larissa (regional unit)